Anthony Heinsbergen (December 13, 1894 – June 14, 1981) was an American muralist considered the foremost designer of North American movie theatre interiors.

Born Antoon Heinsbergen in Haarlem (the Netherlands), he emigrated with his family to the United States in 1906 where they settled in Los Angeles. Heinsbergen began painting while still a boy; and, as a young man he worked as an apprentice painter and was one of the first students to take formal training from Mrs. Nelbert Chouinard at her Chouinard Art Institute in Los Angeles. His area of interest in which he developed a renowned expertise was the painting of murals and in 1922 he went into business for himself. He was successful in obtaining a few commissions out of which he earned considerable recognition that led to a number of major contracts in and around Los Angeles most notably with the Hollywood Roosevelt Hotel, the Beverly-Wilshire Hotel and in 1928 a municipal government contract for the new Los Angeles City Hall. During this time, his work came to the attention of theatre mogul Alexander Pantages who hired him to work on one of his buildings. The praise he received for this work opened the doors to jobs at more than twenty Pantages theatres and helped Heinsbergen become a major national contractor for theatre murals.

Heinsbergen's company grew to employ more than one hundred and eighty decorative painters involved with a wide variety of wall and ceiling murals for corporate offices, churches, synagogues, civic auditoriums, libraries and other ornate structures of the era. However, the  Heinsbergen name is mainly linked to his theatre murals as a result of the more than seven hundred and fifty he created throughout North America during the theatre industry's period of rapid growth. High-profile work of this type includes murals for the Wiltern Theatre, the Oakland Paramount Theater, the Warner Grand Theatre in San Pedro, California, and the United Artists flagship theatre in downtown Los Angeles, plus the vaulted ceiling of the city's Park Plaza Hotel which can be seen in the opening sequences of the 1990 David Lynch film Wild at Heart.

Anthony Heinsbergen built a home in the Los Angeles district of Pacific Palisades on the south slope in the Santa Monica Mountains. Semi-retired by the 1970s when his son Anthony, Jr. (1929–2004), took over the day-to-day management of the company, the elderly Anthony Heinsbergen nonetheless remained active as a  frequent consultant for theatre restoration projects until his death in 1981, in Los Angeles, at the age of eighty-six.

See also
 Heinsbergen Decorating Company Building

1894 births
1981 deaths
Painters from California
Dutch emigrants to the United States
American muralists
Artists from Los Angeles
20th-century American painters
American male painters
20th-century American male artists